Turrilites (Turrilites) costatus is a species of helically coiled ammonoid cephalopod, from the lower part of the Upper Cretaceous (Cenomanian).

Description 
It  is tightly wound in a high trochospiral, with an acute angle at the apex. Ribs are weak, with rows of strong tubercles.

References

 Arkell et al., Mesozoic Ammonoidea (L222); Treatise on Invertebrate Paleontology Part L, Ammonoidea. Geological Soc. of America and Univ Kansas Press.
 The Paleobiology Database Turrilites entry
 Ammonites

Cretaceous ammonites
Turrilitoidea
Cenomanian life